Aliabad-e Deh Kord (also Romanized as ‘Alīābād-e Deh Kord and ‘Alīābād-e Dehkord; also known as ‘Alīābād) is a village in Vardasht Rural District, in the Central District of Semirom County, Isfahan Province, Iran. At the 2006 census, its population was 259, in 58 families.

References 

Populated places in Semirom County